Tanner is an unincorporated community located in LaRue County, Kentucky, United States.

References

Unincorporated communities in LaRue County, Kentucky
Unincorporated communities in Kentucky